The  is a bridge in Tokyo built in 1659 spanning the Sumida River just upstream of its confluence with the Kanda River. Its name, meaning "two provinces", came from its joining Edo (the forerunner of Tokyo in Musashi Province) and Shimōsa Province. The neighborhood at the east end of the bridge, Ryōgoku, derived its name from that of the bridge. The bridge featured in the 2015 anime "Miss Hokusai".

Timeline 
 1659 (Manji 2): Building began on the Ryōgoku Bridge.
 September 1, 1923 (Taishō 12, 1st day of the 9th month):  The bridge was damaged during the Great Kantō earthquake.
 1932 (Shōwa 7): Bridge re-building completed.

Gallery

References

Buildings and structures in Chūō, Tokyo
Buildings and structures in Sumida, Tokyo